Walter Wright may refer to:

 Walter Wright (cricketer) (1856–1940), English cricketer
 Walter Wright (academic), English Tudor academic administrator
 Walter C. Wright, American seminary president
 Walter Wright (boxer) (born 1981), American professional boxer
 Walter Wright (oral historian) (died 1949), Canadian Tsimshian hereditary chief
 Walter Wright (wrestler) (1901–1982), American wrestler
 Walter Livingston Wright (1872–1946), American educator and president of Lincoln University
 Walter Percival Wright (1909–1992), Canadian politician in the Legislative Assembly of British Columbia
 Bricktop Wright (Walter Julian Wright, 1908–1972), American baseball player